EchoStar XXI (formerly known as TerreStar 2) is a European communications satellite which is operated by Echostar Corporation. It was constructed by Space Systems/Loral, based on the SSL 1300 satellite bus, and carries S band transponders which will be used to provide 2 GHz mobile connectivity throughout Europe.

EchoStar XXI was launched at 03:45 UTC on June 8, 2017 from the Baikonur Cosmodrome in Kazakhstan. This satellite was the heaviest commercial payload flown aboard a Russian booster at the time of its launch.

Before being launched, the satellite was known as TerreStar-2, a ground spare for TerreStar Networks' satellite-terrestrial telephone network.

References

External links

Echostar Corporation
Launch video at Spaceflight Now
NASA Spaceflight thread for EchoStar XXI Launch
YouTube video (Russian language) of the rocket rolling to the pad

Spacecraft launched in 2017
High throughput satellites
Communications satellites in geostationary orbit
Spacecraft launched by Proton rockets
E21